Kerva (also Romanized as Kervā; also known as Bālā Gervā-ye ‘Olyā, Bālā Karvā, and Bālā Kervā) is a village in Nowkand Kola Rural District, in the Central District of Qaem Shahr County, Mazandaran Province, Iran. At the 2006 census, its population was 503, in 137 families.

References 

Populated places in Qaem Shahr County